Punta Gorda is a barrio (neighbourhood or district) of Montevideo, Uruguay. It takes its name from the promontory of Punta Gorda.

Location
It borders Malvín to the west, Las Canteras to the northwest, Carrasco Norte and Carrasco to the northeast and the coastline to the south.  The coastal avenue along Punta Gorda takes on the names Rambla O'Higgins and Rambla República de Méjico, across which are the beaches Playa de los Ingleses and Playa Verde.

Landmarks
On top of the promontory is a square which is also a park, the Plaza de la Armada (formerly known as Plaza Virgilio) and it is a tourist hotspot. Another notable sight is the Molino de Perez, a historic watermill, now housing a cultural centre.

Educational facilities
 Colegio y Liceo Santa Rita, Toronto 1597 (private, Roman Catholic, Augustinians)

Places of worship
 Parish Church of St Rita of Cascia, Friburgo 5763 (Roman Catholic, Augustinians)

Gallery

See also 
Barrios of Montevideo

References

External links 

 Intendencia de Montevideo / Useful data / Punta Gorda